Protein sprouty homolog 1 is a protein that in humans is encoded by the SPRY1 gene.

See also 
Neurofibromin 1
SPRED1

References

Further reading

External links 
 
 

SPR domain
Human proteins